Frédéric Schmied (26 July 1893 – 23 September 1972) was a sculptor. He attended the Ecole des Beaux-Arts in Geneva (1916–1921). Schmied's work was exhibited at the Musée Rath in October 1931. His work was also part of the sculpture event in the art competition at the 1924 Summer Olympics.

Works
Aigle de Genève and Colombe de la Paix: two equestrian sculptures at Quai Turrettini, Geneva
Cheval et paysanne, at Collège Jacques-Dalphin, Carouge
Tête de cheval, at Mairie de Lancy, Lancy
Lutteur au repos, at Stade de Frontenex, Geneva 
Saint Martin, 1958, at Rue Dizerens 25, Geneva
Chute de cheval et cavalier, 1954, bronze

References

External links

Swiss sculptors
1893 births
1972 deaths
20th-century sculptors
Olympic competitors in art competitions